Hebe was launched in 1804 at Leith. From 27 April 1804 to 30 October 1812 she served the Royal Navy as a hired armed ship and transport. She spent her entire naval career escorting convoys to the Baltic. Afterwards, she became a transport that an American privateer captured in March 1814.

Career
Hebe first appeared in Lloyd's Register (LR) in 1804.

In February 1804 she escorted seven whalers from Leith, bound for Davis Strait and the British northern whale fishery.

From August 1807 Hebe formed part of Admiral Gambier's inshore squadron for the second battle of Copenhagen. On 23 August, Hebe was part of the advance squadron, which took up position near the entrance to the harbour. An engagement of four hours ensued between the squadron and the Danes, who marshaled the Crown Battery, floating batteries, three praams of 20 guns each, some 30 gunboats, and block ships. The shallowness of the water prevent the Royal Navy from bringing in any large ships to support the advance squadron of brigs, sloops, and ketches. Eventually the British withdrew.

Fate
Hebe was captured in 1814. In March the American privateer Surprize captured Hebe, of Leith, which had been carrying naval stores from Halifax, Nova Scotia to Bermuda. Hebe arrived at North Carolina. LR for 1815 carried the annotation "captured" beneath her name.

Notes, citations, and references
Notes

Citations

References
 
 

1804 ships
Age of Sail merchant ships of England
Hired armed vessels of the Royal Navy
Captured ships